Showgirl: The Greatest Hits Tour was the eighth concert tour by Australian singer Kylie Minogue. It was launched in support of her second major greatest hits compilation, Ultimate Kylie (2004) and visited Europe. It began on 19 March 2005 in Glasgow, Scotland at SECC Concert Hall 4 and concluded on 7 May 2005 in London, England at the Earls Court Exhibition Centre. The tour was announced on 24 October 2004, promoted by 3A Entertainment in Europe and Frontier Touring in Asia and Australia. Showgirl: The Greatest Hits Tour was intended to be a celebration of both Minogue's career and long-term relationship with her audience.

Eight distinct sections divided the tour; Showgirl, Smiley Kylie, Denial, What Kylie Wants, Kylie Gets, Dreams, Kyliesque, Minx in Space and an encore. It featured costumes from designers such as Karl Lagerfeld and Julien Macdonald, as well as the iconic showgirl costume designed by John Galliano. The tour also featured an Art Deco-inspired stage costing £1,000,000. The set list consisted of Minogue's greatest hits along with the singles from Ultimate Kylie.

The tour was also commercially successful. The shows in the United Kingdom sold out in two hours and went on to gross nearly $20 million. In Europe, 339,105 tickets were sold in total. The tour also placed 46th on Pollstar's 2005 "Top 100 Worldwide Tours" at the conclusion of the year. Footage from the 6 May show in London was also filmed for television broadcast and DVD release. It was released on DVD in November 2005, titled Showgirl. The following month, a live album of the same name was released, featuring eight songs from the show.

Twenty shows in Australia and three shows in Asia were originally scheduled for the tour. Following the conclusion of the European leg, Minogue travelled to Australia to continue the tour, where she was diagnosed with breast cancer. The remainder of the tour, including a headlining slot at the 2005 Glastonbury Festival, was consequently cancelled. The shows in Australia were rescheduled and 14 additional shows in the United Kingdom were added following Minogue's recovery. The tour resumed in November 2006, renamed Showgirl: The Homecoming Tour, with a revised set list and new costumes to accommodate her medical state.

Background
Following a "lacklustre" reception to the release of her ninth studio album, Body Language (2003), Minogue's second major greatest hits compilation was announced in August 2004. In October of the same year, it was announced that Minogue would embark on Showgirl: The Greatest Hits Tour to promote the compilation, and Ultimate Kylie was released to critical reception the following month. She described the tour as "a celebration of pop songs and my career, but also a long-term relationship with my audience". The tour was promoted by 3A Entertainment in Europe and Frontier Touring in Asia and Australia.

Dates for shows in Europe were announced first. All shows in the United Kingdom sold out within two hours. The announcement of dates in Australia and Asia followed, as well as a headline appearance at the 2005 Glastonbury Festival. Minogue was scheduled to be the first female to headline the festival since 1999.

Postponements and cancellations 
Prior to the tour, Minogue underwent a mammogram due to health concerns and was given an all-clear by doctors, but found a lump on her breast shortly after. The tour commenced and, following the conclusion of the European shows, she travelled to Australia to continue the tour. On 17 May 2005, it was announced that Minogue had been diagnosed with breast cancer during a family visit to Melbourne, and would undergo immediate treatment. As a consequence, the remaining dates of Showgirl: The Greatest Hits Tour were cancelled. In a statement issued by her record company, Minogue said that she "was so looking forward to bringing the Showgirl tour to Australia and to Glastonbury and I'm sorry to have to disappoint my fans". She later underwent a lumpectomy and an eight-month cycle of chemotherapy and radiotherapy.

Tour resumption 

Following Minogue's recovery, the resumption of the tour was announced in June 2006. The rescheduled tour was renamed Showgirl: The Homecoming Tour, and was originally planned to consist of dates in Australia only. Shows in the United Kingdom were added, and the tour commenced in November 2006. Alterations to the set list, choreography and costumes were made to accommodate Minogue's medical condition.

Concert synopsis
The show was split into seven acts, being them Showgirl, Smiley Kylie, Denial, What Kylie Wants, Kylie Gets, Dreams, Kyliesque, Minx in Space, with the addition of an encore. The show opens with an instrumental introduction that features writing on the video screen introducing Minogue. She then rises out of the stage on a platform dressed in a blue showgirl outfit. She begins singing "Better the Devil You Know", which is quickly followed by performances of "In Your Eyes" and "Giving You Up". Minogue then performs "On a Night Like This", which begins in the style of a ballad, before resuming with the original after the first chorus. The ending is in the same style as the beginning of the song, where Minogue is taken below the stage, closing the section.

The second section begins with a dance interlude, that uses excerpts of "Shocked" and "Do You Dare?", before Minogue rises out of the centre of the stage as the DNA intro of "Shocked" is heard. She sings up to the middle eight, before a short segue is played using excerpts of "It's No Secret", "Keep on Pumpin' It", "Give Me Just a Little More Time" and "What Kind of Fool (Heard All That Before)", which leads into a two-verse-two-chorus performance of "What Do I Have to Do", which is succeeded by another segue using an excerpt of "Over Dreaming (Over You)" and then a performance of "Spinning Around" (sampling the instrumentation of "Finally"), which is followed by a dance interlude after the middle eight using excerpts of "Step Back in Time" and "Such a Good Feeling".

The third section begins with a performance of "In Denial", a virtual duet with Neil Tennant. This is followed by a performance of "Je Ne Sais Pas Pourquoi", before Minogue closes the act with a performance of "Confide in Me".

The fourth act begins with a spraying sound effect during which fake showers and gym equipment rises onto the stage, before Minogue appears on a box singing "Red Blooded Woman" which features a chorus of "Where the Wild Roses Grow" before the middle eight. Minogue then performs "Slow" which is followed by a small flamenco interlude which precedes a performance of "Please Stay".

The fifth section begins with a cover of "Somewhere Over the Rainbow" where Minogue rises from behind the stage on a sequinned moon. This is then followed by a torch version of "Come into My World". Minogue then performs "Chocolate" on the stage, which morphs at the end of the catwalk to form a "cake", from which Minogue performs "I Believe in You". The act closes with a performance of "Dreams".

The sixth section opens with a performance of "Hand on Your Heart", where Minogue emerges on stage in front of a big heart. She then goes on to perform a jazz version of "The Locomotion" which is followed by a performance of "I Should Be So Lucky". Minogue then closes the act with a performance of "Your Disco Needs You".

The penultimate section opens with a performance version of "Put Yourself in My Place", and a performance of "Can't Get You Out of My Head" closes the main body of the show. Minogue then performed a two-song encore, talking to the audience before performing a sing-a-long version of "Especially for You", with the audience invited to sing Jason Donovan's part. Minogue then closed the show with a performance of "Love at First Sight", with a video montage of her career shown on the video screens behind her.

Setlist
Act 1: Showgirl
"Overture"
"Better the Devil You Know"
"In Your Eyes"
"Giving You Up"
"On a Night Like This"

Act 2: Smiley Kylie
 "Shocked" (contains excerpts from "Do You Dare?", "It's No Secret", "Give Me Just A Little More Time", "Keep on Pumpin' It" and "What Kind of Fool (Heard All That Before)")
 "What Do I Have to Do" (contains excerpt from "I'm Over Dreaming (Over You)")
 "Spinning Around" (contains excerpts from "Step Back in Time" along with elements of "Finally" and "Such a Good Feeling") 

Act 3: Denial
"In Denial" 
"Je Ne Sais Pas Pourquoi"
"Confide in Me"

Act 4: What Kylie Wants, Kylie Gets
"Red Blooded Woman" (contains excerpts from "Where the Wild Roses Grow")
"Slow"
"Please Stay"

Act 5: Dreams
"Over the Rainbow"
"Come into My World"
"Chocolate"
"I Believe in You"
"Dreams"

Act 6: Kyliesque
"Hand on Your Heart"
"The Loco-Motion"
"I Should Be So Lucky"
"Your Disco Needs You"

Act 7: Minx in Space
"Put Yourself in My Place"
"Can't Get You Out of My Head"

Encore
"Especially for You" (Intro contains an excerpt of "Love's in Need of Love Today")
"Love at First Sight"

Tour dates

Cancelled shows

Broadcasts and recordings

Minogue's performance at Earls Court Exhibition Centre in London on 6 May 2005 was filmed for television broadcast and DVD release. The performance was released on DVD and Universal Media Disc on 28 November 2005, and was simply titled Showgirl. The DVD also featured "Behind the Feathers", a documentary, screensavers and exclusive photographs. The DVD reached number twenty-six on Australia's End of the Year Music DVD Chart in 2005. It was certified platinum in the UK in 2005 and four times platinum in Australia in 2006. Showgirl was nominated for Best Music DVD at the 2006 ARIA Music Awards, losing to Eskimo Joe.

On 12 December 2005, Minogue released a digital EP featuring eight songs recorded in London, England during the Showgirl: The Greatest Hits Tour, again titled Showgirl.

Personnel
Russel Thomas – director
Bill Lord – executive producer
Kylie Minogue – executive producer
Terry Blamey – executive producer
William Baker – creative director
Alan MacDonald – creative director
Steve Anderson – musical producer
Sean Fitzpatrick – tour manager
Michael Rooney – choreography 
Rafael Bonachela – choreography 
John Galliano – costume design
Karl Lagerfeld – costume design
Julien Macdonald – costume design
Ed Meadham – costume design
Gareth Pugh – costume design
Manolo Blahnik – shoes
Bvlgari – jewelry
Stephen Jones – millinery
Karen Alder – hair stylist

See also
"2005 Showgirl – The Greatest Hits Tour"
SHOWGIRL 2005
Kylie Minogue SHOW GIRL the Greatest Hits tour – 2005

External links
Kylie's Official Site

References

2005 concert tours
April 2005 events in Europe
April 2005 events in the United Kingdom
Kylie Minogue concert tours
March 2005 events in Europe
March 2005 events in the United Kingdom
May 2005 events in the United Kingdom